Return to Oz is:

 Return to Oz, 1985 film
 Return to Oz (TV special), 1964 animated television special
 "Return to Oz", 2004 song from the Scissor Sisters album Scissor Sisters